Ginkgo adiantoides is an extinct ginkgo species in the family Ginkgoaceae from the Late Cretaceous to the Miocene.

Evolutionary history is unresolved. Morphological and molecular data show a wide range of possible relationships with cycads and conifers.

Ginkgo leaves were borne on both long and short shoots on lateral branches of the main stem. They are recognized by their distinctive leaf shape and open dichotomous venation pattern. Ginkogoales are spermatophytes, belong to the lignophyte clade, and are euphyllophytes.

References

 Paleobotany, Second Edition: The Biology and Evolution of Fossil Plants by Thomas N. Taylor, Edith L. Taylor and Michael Krings - Page 748
 North America Through Time: A Paleontological History of Our Continent by Lynne M. Clos - Page 172
 Jurassic and Cretaceous Floras and Climates of the Earth by V. A. Vakhrameev, Norman F. Hughes and Ju V. Litvinov - Page 110
 Fossil Plants: A Text-Book for Students of Botany and Geology (Cambridge Library Collection - Earth Science) by A. C. Seward - Page 10

adiantoides
Paleocene plants
Eocene plants
Miocene plants
Oligocene plants
Prehistoric trees